The Ministry of Justice of the Republic of Abkhazia is a body of state administration in the Republic of Abkhazia that ensures the implementation of the state policy in the sphere of notaries, registrars, advocates, ensuring the established order of the courts and execution of judicial acts, registration of public associations, political parties and movements, enterprises, organizations and institutions.

Regulations on the Ministry of Justice of the Republic of Abkhazia approved the Resolution of the Cabinet of Ministers of the Republic of Abkhazia of March 17, 1995 No. 59.

The new regulation on the Ministry of Justice was adopted on May 27, 2005 under No. 112.

Structure of the Ministry of Justice of Abkhazia 

 Office of the Ministry
 Republican Scientific Research Institute of Forensic Expertise
 Notary offices of the Republic of Abkhazia:
 Notary office No. 1, Sukhum city
 Notary Office No. 2, Sukhum
 Notary office No. 3 in Sukhum
 Notary office No. 4, Sukhum
 Notary Office No. 5, Sukhum
 Notary office No. 6 in Sukhum
 Notary office No. 1 of the Sukhum district
 Notary office No. 2 of the Sukhum district
 Notary office No. 1 of the Gulrysh district
 Notary office No. 2 of the Gulrysh district
 New Athos city notary office
 Notary office No. 1 of Gudauta district
 Notary office No. 2 of Gudauta district
 Notary office No. 1 of Gagra district
 Notary office No. 2 of Gagra district
 Notary office in Tsandriipsh village
 Notary office of Pitsunda settlement
 Notary office of Ochamchyrsky district
 Notary office of Tkuarchal district
 Notary office of Gal district
 ZAGS of the Republic of Abkhazia:
 ZAGS city of Sukhum
 Registrar of the Sukhum district
 Registry office of Gulryshsky district
 Registry Office in New Athos
 Registry office of Gudauta district
 ZAGS Gagra district
 Registry office in Pitsunda
 Ochamchyrsky district registry office
 Registry Office of Tkuarchal district
 Registry office of Gal district
 Republican Civil Registry Office

List of ministers

See also 

 Justice ministry
Министерство юстиции Республики Абхазия (Ministry of Justice of the Republic of Abkhazia)
 Politics of Abkhazia

References 

Justice ministries
Government of Abkhazia
Ministers for Justice of Abkhazia